The Payne House, formally known as Atkins' Ridge, is a historic raised Greek Revival cottage in Greensboro, Alabama, USA.

History
The house was built by John Atkins in 1840. It was purchased by Pascal Tutwiler, Sr. in 1911. It remained in the Tutwiler family until 1971, when it was bought by Dr. James H. Payne, who restored it.

The house is included as part of the Plantation Houses of the Alabama Canebrake and Their Associated Outbuildings Multiple Property Submission. It was added to the National Register of Historic Places on July 7, 1994, due to its architectural significance.

References

National Register of Historic Places in Hale County, Alabama
Houses on the National Register of Historic Places in Alabama
Greek Revival houses in Alabama
Houses completed in 1840
Houses in Hale County, Alabama
Historic districts in Hale County, Alabama
Historic districts on the National Register of Historic Places in Alabama